Moananui Islet is an islet in Penrhyn Atoll (Tongareva) in the Cook Islands.

The main village of the atoll, Omoka, is situated on Moananui Islet. Tongareva Airport is on this island.

References

Penrhyn atoll